Preliminary round matches was played from the 19 to 23 October and matches in the main Qualifying round was played from the 14 to 18 December.

Preliminary round

Group A
The qualification was held in Tbilisi, Georgia

Moldova went through by coefficient

Group B
The qualification was held in Sofia, Bulgaria

Group C
The qualification was held in Jelgava, Latvia

Group D
The qualification was held in Kiili, Estonia

Group E
The qualification was held in Veles, Macedonia

Best group runners-up

Qualifying round
The main round was played from 14 to 18 December 2011.

Group 1
The qualification was held in Sarajevo, Bosnia and Herzegovina.

Group 2
The qualification was held in Caltanissetta, Italy.

Group 3
The qualification was held in Laško, Slovenia.

Group 4
The qualification was held in Coimbra, Portugal.

Group 5
The qualification was held in Baku, Azerbaijan.

Group 6
The qualification was held in Brno, Czech Republic.

Group 7
The qualification was held in Gyöngyös, Hungary.

Play-offs 
The top two in each progress to the two-legged play-offs, which will decide Europe's qualifiers. 

|}

1st leg 
From 25 March to 28 March 2012

2nd leg 
From 8 to 11 April 2012

Ukraine won 5–4 on aggregate.

Serbia won 6–2 on aggregate.

Russia won 5–4 on aggregate.

Spain won 12–0 on aggregate.

Portugal won 11–2 on aggregate.

Czech Republic won 4–3 on aggregate.

Italy won 7–0 on aggregate.

Qualified teams

References
 Nations learn Futsal World Cup qualifying path

External links
 Official UEFA website

Q
FIFA Futsal World Cup qualification (UEFA)
Qual